Pibulsongkram Rajabhat University Football Club (Thai สโมสรฟุตบอลมหาวิทยาลัยราชภัฏพิบูลสงคราม), is a Thai football club based in Chiang Mai, Thailand. The club is currently playing in the 2017 Thailand Amateur League Northern Region.

Record

References
 https://www.phitsanulokhotnews.com/2016/11/10/94797
 http://www.supersubthailand.com/news/450-21/index.html#sthash.wof1aDka.dpbs
 http://bgfconlineshop.com/bg_sports_news/index.php?r=bgfc/detail&id=3660
 https://sport.mthai.com/football-thai/274241.html

External links
 Facebook  Page

Association football clubs established in 2016
Football clubs in Thailand
Sport in Chiang Mai
2016 establishments in Thailand
University and college association football clubs